This is a list of lists of notable individuals from Sri Lanka.

Academics

Activists and heroes

National Heroes of Sri Lanka
Sri Lankan independence activist

Actors

Architects

Aviators

Broadcasters

Buddhist monks

Civil servants
List of Sri Lankan non-career Permanent Secretaries

Composers

Diaspora

Diplomats
List of Sri Lankan non-career diplomats

Educational institution

Engineers

Ethnicity

Film directors

Industrialists

Journalists

Judges

Military personnel

Monarchs and royalty

Musicians and singers

Politicians

List of presidents of Sri Lanka
List of prime ministers of Sri Lanka

Sportspeople

Writers

See also
 List of people on stamps of Sri Lanka

References